Jeep Renegade may refer to:

 Jeep Renegade, a subcompact crossover SUV produced since 2014
 Jeep Renegade (concept), a 2008 concept vehicle
 Renegade, a trim package on different models of the Jeep CJ
 YJ Wrangler Renegade, a trim package of the Jeep Wrangler
 Renegade, a trim package of the Jeep Liberty